Millmerran–Inglewood Road is a continuous  road route in the Toowoomba and Goondiwindi regions of Queensland, Australia. The road is signed as State Route 82. Millmerran–Inglewood Road (number 337) is a state-controlled regional road.

Route Description
Land use on this section is mainly crop farming. The road continues south through , where it passes through the Bringalily State Forest before re-entering open country as it approaches  Here it follows Canning Creek (the watercourse) to the south-west. It ends at an intersection with the Cunningham Highway just east of the Inglewood CBD.

State Route 82
It is not necessarily the best or the shortest or the quickest route between the two terminii. It was proclaimed as a State Route because, at the time, it was the most convenient route for many users. It is also an example of why motorists in unfamiliar territory should follow a designated route rather than rely on a vehicle navigation system, which may direct them onto less suitable alternative roads.

Here the Chinchilla–Wondai Road turns west, while State Route 82 continues south on Jandowae  Connection Road to Jandowae. In Jandowae the road name changes to Dalby–Jandowae Road, which continues to the Warrego Highway in the west of Dalby. From there it follows the Warrego Highway to the south-east until it reaches Dalby–Cecil Plains Road, where it continues south.

At a T-junction in Cecil Plains, State Route 82 turns east on Toowoomba–Cecil Plains Road until it reaches Pampas–Horrane Road, where it turns south. Note that many navigation systems will suggest a turn to the west in Cecil Plains, leading to Millmerran–Cecil Plains Road. From there it follows the Gore Highway south-west to Millmerran, where it turns south on the Millmerran–Inglewood Road. This road continues south to Inglewood, where it meets the Cunningham Highway at a T-junction.

History

Yandilla pastoral run was established in 1842. In 1881 part of Yandilla was selected for the town of Millmerran.

Inglewood was settled in the 1860s and became a commercial centre for its district. This resulted in the development of small farms to the north of Bringalily State Forest, and a growing need for a road to Inglewood, the nearest town for many.

The outcome was the completion of a reliable road from Millmerran to Inglewood.

Major intersections
All distances are from Google Maps.

See also

 List of road routes in Queensland
 List of numbered roads in Queensland

Notes

References

Roads in Queensland